is a railway station on the Tōhoku Main Line in the city of Shiogama, Miyagi, Japan, operated by East Japan Railway Company (JR East).

Lines
Shiogama Station is served by the Tōhoku Main Line, and lies 365.2 km from the official starting point of the line at Tokyo Station. Trains of the Senseki-Tōhoku Line also stop at Shiogama Station, which is 14.3 kilometers from the official starting point of the line at Sendai Station.

Station layout
Shiogama Station has one elevated island platform serving two tracks, with the station building situated underneath. The station has a "Midori no Madoguchi" staffed ticket office.

Platforms

History
Shiogama Station opened on July 9, 1956. The station was absorbed into the JR East network upon the privatization of the Japanese National Railways (JNR) on April 1, 1987.

Passenger statistics
In fiscal 2016, the station was used by an average of 2,931 passengers daily (boarding passengers only).

Surrounding area
Shiogama City Tamagawa Elementary School
East Shiogama Tamagawa Post Office
Shiogama City Hospital
Shiogama Shrine
National Route 45

See also
 List of Railway Stations in Japan

References

External links

  

Railway stations in Miyagi Prefecture
Tōhoku Main Line
Railway stations in Japan opened in 1956
Shiogama, Miyagi
Stations of East Japan Railway Company